Thomas Ming Swi Chang,  (born 8 April 1933) is a Canadian physician, medical scientist, and inventor.

In 1957, while an undergraduate at McGill University he invented the world's first artificial cell. Working with improvised materials like perfume atomizers inside his dorm room turned laboratory, Chang managed to create a permeable plastic sack that would effectively carry haemoglobin almost as effectively as a natural blood cell. He went on to complete his B.Sc. (1957), M.D. (1961), and Ph.D (1965) degrees at McGill. Chang's career continued as founder and Director of the Artificial Cells and Organs Research Centre and Professor of Physiology, Medicine & Biomedical Engineering in the Faculty of Medicine at McGill University.

In the late 1960s he discovered enzymes carried by artificial cells could correct some metabolic disorders and also developed charcoal-filled cells to treat drug poisoning. His work on finding a safe blood substitute brought him to prominence in the 1980s and 1990s, earning him an Order of Canada. The Canadian Academy of Health Sciences states, "Dr. Chang’s original ideas were years ahead of the modern era of nanotechnology, regenerative medicine, gene therapy, stem cell/cell therapy and blood substitutes. Evidence of his stature within the international scientific community was confirmed by two nominations for the Nobel Prize".

In 2011, Dr. Chang was voted the winner of the Greatest McGillian contest organized by the McGill Alumni Association for McGill's 190th anniversary. Dr. Chang has remained resolutely focused on science, and largely indifferent to the commercial aspects of his work. “To me as a scientist what is most important is what is most useful to the patient, not what is good for your reputation or what pays the most money. The sick patient should be the most important stimulus for our work.”

References

External links 
Artificial Cells, Blood Substitutes & Nanomedicine at the Artificial Cells & Organs Research Centre

1933 births
Living people
Canadian inventors
Canadian medical academics
Canadian physiologists
Chinese emigrants to Canada
McGill University Faculty of Medicine alumni
Academic staff of McGill University
Officers of the Order of Canada
People from Shantou